Maloserdobinsky District is an administrative and municipal district (raion), one of the twenty-seven in Penza Oblast, Russia. It is located in the south of the oblast. Its administrative center is the rural locality (a selo) of Malaya Serdoba. Population: 9,824 (2010 Census);  The population of Malaya Serdoba accounts for 44.5% of the district's total population.

There are 22 settlements in the Maloserdobinsky district.

Notable residents 

Feodor Gladkov (1883–1958), socialist realist writer
Yuri Vechkasov (1948–2022), politician, born in the village of Novoye Demkino

References

Notes

Sources

Districts of Penza Oblast